St Saviour's Church is a Church of England parish church in Larkhall, Bath, Somerset England.

The church was founded by Archdeacon Charles Moysey in 1824 following the Church Building Act 1824. St Saviour's is one of three Commissioners' churches in Bath and one of six hundred nationally.

The church was constructed between 1829 and 1832 probably by architect John Pinch the younger based on a design by his father, John Pinch the elder. The church was later expanded in 1882 when a chancel was added
by architect C.E. Davis.

The church's crypt was opened in 1832. In October 1832, Rear-Admiral Volant Vashon Ballard was the first person to be interred in the crypt. More than 200 people were buried at the church before the burial grounds were closed in 1891. Subsequent burials took place in Locksbrook Cemetery until 1937.

The church is currently led by The Reverend Michael Norman who has been rector since 1998.

References

External links

Official website

19th-century Church of England church buildings
Churches in Bath, Somerset
Religious buildings and structures completed in 1832
Commissioners' church buildings
Bath, St Saviour's Church
Bath, St Saviour's Church